The Old Government House in Pietermaritzburg, South Africa, was the official residence of the Lieutenant-Governor of Natal, Sir Benjamin Pine, who arrived in Natal in 1851. The building was completed in the late 1860s. The Natal Government later bought it from Pine and established it as the Government House.

According to a 19th-century visitor: "Driving up to Government House one is struck by its very homely English appearance: in its outward form there has been not striving after giving it the resemblance of a palace: it is after a cottage type, and reminds me of many a vicarage at home."

References

See also
Government Houses of South Africa
Government Houses of the British Empire

Houses completed in the 19th century
Official residences in South Africa
Government Houses of the British Empire and Commonwealth
19th-century architecture in South Africa